William FitzRobert, 2nd Earl of Gloucester (23 November 1116 – 23 November 1183) was the son and heir of Sir Robert de Caen, 1st Earl of Gloucester, and Mabel FitzRobert of Gloucester, daughter of Robert Fitzhamon, and nephew of Empress Matilda.

Lineage 

William FitzRobert was the son of Robert, 1st Earl of Gloucester, an illegitimate son of King Henry I of England, during whose reign William was born. Thus William was a nephew of the Empress Maud and a first cousin once removed of King Stephen, the principal combatants of the English Anarchy period. It also meant that William is the great-grandson of the famed William the Conqueror.

Early career 

In October 1141, William looked after the Baronial estates, when his father fell into the hands of partisans at Winchester. His father was exchanged for King Stephen, and during his father's absence in Normandy in 1144 he served as Governor of Wareham. In 1147, he overthrew Henry de Tracy at Castle Cary.

In 1154 he made an alliance with Roger de Clare, 3rd Earl of Hertford, by which they agreed to aid each other against all men except Henry II of England.

FitzRobert granted Neath, a town in Glamorgan, a charter. He was Lord of the manor of Glamorgan, as well as Caerleon, residing chiefly at Cardiff Castle. It was there that in 1158 he and his wife and son were captured by the Welsh Lord of Senghenydd, Ifor Bach ("Ivor the Little") and carried away into the woods, where they were held as prisoners until the Earl redressed Ivor's grievances.

Relationship with King Henry II
In 1173 the earl took the King's part against his sons, but thereafter he appears to have fallen under suspicion, for the following year he submitted to the King, and in 1175 surrendered to him Bristol Castle. Because his only son and heir Robert died in 1166, Earl William made John, the younger son of King Henry II, heir to his earldom, in conformity with the King's promise that John should marry one of the Earl's daughters, if the Church would allow it, they being related in the third degree.

Earl William was present in March 1177 when the King arbitrated between the Kings of Castile and Navarre, and in 1178, he witnessed Henry's charter to Waltham Abbey. But during the King's struggles with his sons, when he imprisoned a number of magnates of whose loyalty he was doubtful, Earl William was among them.

Family and children
He was married to Hawise de Beaumont of Leicester, daughter of Robert de Beaumont, 2nd Earl of Leicester and Amica de Gael and had children:
 Robert fitz William (1151, Cardiff, Glamorganshire – 1166, Cardiff, Glamorganshire).
 Mabel fitz William, married Amaury V de Montfort, her son Amaury briefly being Earl of Gloucester
 Amice fitz William, d. 1220. Married Richard de Clare, 3rd Earl of Hertford, their descendants eventually inherited the Earldom of Gloucester.
 Isabel, Countess of Gloucester. She was married three times:
 John of England
 Geoffrey FitzGeoffrey de Mandeville, 2nd Earl of Essex, Earl of Gloucester
 Hubert de Burgh, 1st Earl of Kent

The earl died in 1183; his wife Hawise survived him. Since their only son, Robert, predeceased his father, their daughters became co-heirs to the feudal barony of Gloucester.

References

Notes
 William Lord of Glamorgan was also known as Robert de Wintona according to records found in English historical ledgers.

1116 births
1183 deaths
12th-century English nobility
Anglo-Normans
Anglo-Normans in Wales
William Fitz Robert, 2nd Earl of Gloucester
Lords of Glamorgan